Shri Ram Bhakta Hanuman (Hanuman, The Worshipper of Lord Rama) is a 1948 Hindi religious film  produced and directed by Homi Wadia for Basant Pictures. The story was adapted from Valmiki's Ramayana by Shivram Vashikar and the dialogues were written by P. C. Joshi. S. N. Tripathi not only provided music for the film but acted the main role of Hanuman. The film starred Trilok Kapoor, S. N. Tripathi, Sona Chatterjee, Niranjan Sharma and Prabhash Joshi.

The story taken from an episode of Valmiki Ramayana centre's around the abduction of Sita by Ravana, and Hanuman's support to Rama and Lakshman in the battle against Ravana.

Plot
Ravana (Niranjan Sharma) orders Maricha to turn into a deer to entice Sita (Sona Chatterjee) with the notion of kidnapping her. Rama (Trilok Kapoor), Lakshman (Prabhash Joshi) and Sita are in the Panchavati forest for their fourteen-year exile. Espying the golden deer sent by Ravana to lure Rama away, Sita asks Rama to get it. On hearing a cry of pain she sends Lakshman after his brother thinking he's hurt. Ravan comes in the guise of a hermit begging alms and makes Sita step over the Lakshman Rekha (line), Lakshman had drawn around their cottage for her safety, asking her not to step beyond it.  In their search for Sita, Ram and Lakshman meet Hanuman (S. N. Tripathi) whom they help in the fight between Sugriva and Bali. Hanuman then helps in finding Sita. He goes through several challenges in his devotion to Ram. Hanuman becomes a major factor in the battle between Rama and Ravana resulting in the victory of Rama and Shri Ram's subsequent return to Ayodhya.

Cast
 S. N. Tripathi as Hanuman
 Trilok Kapoor as Shri Rama
 Prabhash Joshi as Lakshman 
 Sona Chatterjee as Sita
 Niranjan Sharma as Ravana/Sugriva
 Leela Kumari as Mandodari
 Pandit Amarnath as Angad
 Dalpat as Meghnad
 Shri Bhagwan as Vibhishan
 Rajni
 Kamal Kumar as Nal
 Korega

Music
The music composer was S. N. Tripathi who gave music for several mythological and fantasy films and was "tagged as a mythological composer" His use of classical Raagas brought an authenticity to the songs making them popular even today. The lyrics of the film are credited to Homi Wadia with the singers including S. N. Tripathi, Sona Chatterjee and Mukesh.

Song List

Remake
It was remade in  1969, starring Abhi Bhattacharya, Raaj Kumar and B.M.Vyas directed by Shantilal Soni.

References

External links

1948 films
1940s Hindi-language films
Indian black-and-white films
Films directed by Homi Wadia
Hindu mythological films
Films scored by S. N. Tripathi
Films based on the Ramayana
Indian action films
1940s action films
Hindi-language action films